The Custer CCW-5 was a twin-engined, 5-seat aircraft of pusher configuration, which used a channel wing claimed to enable low speed flight and short take-offs. Two CCW-5s flew, eleven years apart, but the type never entered production.

The aircraft was the third and last of a series of Custer Channel Wing designs.

Design and development
In most situations an aircraft's lift comes chiefly from the low pressure generated on the upper surface by the locally enhanced higher air velocity.  This latter may be the result of the movement of the aircraft through the air or, when lift at low air speeds is important for short take-off performance, produced by engine power. The channel wing, the brainchild of  Willard Ray Custer, is an example of the latter, where the air velocity over the upper surface velocity in a U-shaped channel formed out of the wing was increased with a pusher propeller at the trailing edge. This near semi-circular channel laterally constrained the airflow produced by the propeller, even when the aircraft was at rest, producing higher flow velocities than over a conventional pusher wing. The need for wing mounted pusher engines made a pusher twin a natural configuration, and for his third channel wing design Custer chose to modify the existing Baumann Brigadier, a 5-seat mid wing pusher twin which itself did not reach production.

The CCW-5 retained the fuselage and empennage of the Brigadier, but replaced the whole center section with a pair of channels, starting at roots in the lower part of the fuselage. Only beyond the channels did the conventional wings regain their mid-wing configuration. A  Continental O-470 flat six engine was mounted on slender vertical and horizontal struts at the center of each the channels, on the mid-wing line. These drove constant speed pusher propellers. The main undercarriage was much shortened by mounting its legs on the outer part of the channel section; the Brigadier nosewheel was retained.

The first of two CCW-5s flew on 13 July 1953 and was piloted by Walker Davidson at Oxnard, California. It was reported to have completed its test flying by autumn 1956, when production was scheduled to begin. This did not happen, though a second aircraft flew in June 1964. The delay was partly the result of financial problems. The CCW-5 performed well below the original estimates with a maximum achieved speed of  compared with an estimated .

The second CCW-5 was finished in 1964 with  Continental IO-470P engines; it survives and is under restoration at the Mid-Atlantic Air Museum, Reading, Pennsylvania.

Specifications

See also

Notes

References

Channel-wing aircraft
CCW-5
1950s United States civil utility aircraft
Twin-engined pusher aircraft
Aircraft first flown in 1953